Fort-town is a townland in County Tyrone, Northern Ireland. It is situated in the historic barony of Strabane Lower and the civil parish of Urney and covers an area of 57 acres. 

Census information from 1841 to 1891 inclusive records zero population and housing.

See also
List of townlands of County Tyrone

References

Townlands of County Tyrone
Civil parish of Urney